The Bentley BR.1 was a British rotary aircraft engine of the First World War. Designed by the motor car engine designer W. O. Bentley, the BR.1 was built in large numbers, being one of the main powerplants of the Sopwith Camel.

Design and development
The  Clerget 9B was an important engine for the British Royal Naval Air Service and Royal Flying Corps, being license-produced in Britain and powering a number of important British aircraft, including the Sopwith Camel. However, at £907 a copy it was expensive, and prone to overheating, so the Admiralty asked Lieutenant W. O. Bentley, an established pre-war engine designer, to produce a modified version to solve these problems.

Bentley came up with his idea of an engine - fitted with aluminium cylinders with cast iron liners, and aluminium pistons. The cost of the engine was also reduced, falling to £605 per engine.

The resulting engine, initially known as the A.R.1 for "Admiralty Rotary", but later called the BR.1 ("Bentley Rotary") was manufactured in quantity, although initially against Admiralty orders. It was standardised for the Camel in RNAS squadrons, but unfortunately there were never enough to entirely replace the older and more expensive Clerget engine in British service, and most RFC Camel squadrons continued to use Clerget engines; in fact licensed production of the Clerget continued.

The BR.1 was developed as the BR.2, a heavier, more powerful engine, which powered, among other types or aircraft, the Camel's eventual replacement, the Sopwith Snipe.

Applications
 Avro 536
 Port Victoria P.V.9
 Sopwith Camel
 Westland N.1B

Specifications

See also

References

External links

Rotary aircraft piston engines
Air-cooled aircraft piston engines
1910s aircraft piston engines